The Moon Lay Hidden Beneath a Cloud was an Austrian musical duo composed of Albin Julius and Alzbeth. Their music reflected their deep fascination with myriad aspects of European medievalism including ritual, clerical chants and the daily experience of the peasantry.

Overview
Their music combined modern electronics, tape loops and samplers with medieval instruments such as hurdy-gurdy, shawm, and Hexenscheit.  Alzbeth was the primary vocalist for the group and often sang traditional songs in numerous archaic languages including Middle High German, Latin and Old French. Julius provided distorted and backup vocals.

When performing live, the band often played in old churches, fortresses, medieval prisons and theatres that provided an appropriate atmosphere for their static, militaristic performances.

Early on, the band provided no official photographs or any more information outside of a Swiss mailing address found inside of the albums. The band rarely appeared live or granted interviews. No songs were ever given official titles. After their split, both of the duo were considerably more vocal and promotional images were released.

With each subsequent release the band presented themes traveling further into European history and becoming more martial, choral and bombastic in approach, culminating in their final album; the largely World War II-inspired The Smell of Blood but Victory (1997).

In 1998, the duo, also a couple, parted ways and recorded no new material. All of the group's music was released on their own Arthur's Round Table record label and distributed by World Serpent Distribution.

Post-Split
At the same time as the recording  of The Smell Of Blood But Victory, Julius released material on a then-side project he called Der Blutharsch. This has subsequently become Julius' main project after the split. Julius has since played live and released some Der Blutharsch covers of TMLHBAC material that he has claimed was originally intended for Der Blutharsch.

Alzbeth did erect an official TMLHBAC website and has said that she will be releasing material by a musical project of her own.

In 2000, Alzbeth released a book after the duo parted ways. This hard-back and cloth-bound book included lyrics, photographs and references for the historical themes used by the band.

In 2004, likely spurred by the bankruptcy of World Serpent Distribution and the subsequent out of print status for the band's entire catalogue, Alzbeth announced through her mailing list that Julius and she had decided to rerelease their back catalogue in some form in the future.

Albin Julius died on May 4th, 2022.

Discography

Albums and EPs

Compilations

Other

See also 
List of ambient music artists

External links

Official
Official The Moon Lay Hidden Beneath a Cloud site (http://totem-records.com/art/band.htm: not accessible as of 07.03.08)
via Archive.org (archived 2007-02-16)

Unofficial
Interview from Descent magazine
Myspace Fan Page

References 

Martial industrial groups
Neofolk music groups
Austrian musical duos
Musical groups established in 1993
Musical groups disestablished in 1998
Dark ambient music groups
1993 establishments in Austria
1998 disestablishments in Austria